"All In" is a song by American rapper Lil Baby, released for digital download on April 23, 2020 as the fourth single from his second studio album My Turn (2020), with an accompanying music video.

Background 
Lil Baby previewed the song on March 17, 2020, along with the announcement of his upcoming mixtape Lamborghini Boys. The song appears on the deluxe edition of My Turn, released in May.

Music video 
Released along with the single, the music video shows Lil Baby "cleaning his jewelry and flexing with his friends."

Charts

Certifications

References 

2020 singles
2020 songs
Lil Baby songs
Motown singles
Songs written by Lil Baby
Songs written by Quay Global
Song recordings produced by Quay Global